The Saleina Glacier (formerly spelled Saleinaz) is a  long glacier (2002) situated on the north-eastern edge of the Mont Blanc Massif in the canton of Valais in Switzerland. It flows in a roughly north-easterly direction from the Aiguille d'Argentière, down towards the Val Ferret. The Saleina Hut sits above its right bank at an altitude of 2,691 meters above sea level.

See also
List of glaciers in Switzerland
List of glaciers
Retreat of glaciers since 1850
Swiss Alps

External links
Glacier de Saleina on French IGN mapping portal
Swiss glacier monitoring network

Glaciers of Valais
Glaciers of the Alps